The Democratic Army of Greece (DAG) was the army founded by the Communist Party of Greece during the Greek Civil War (1946–1949). At its height, it had a strength of around 50,000 men and women.

The DSE was backed up by the Popular Civil Guard, the Communist Party's security police force.

History
After the liberation of Greece from the Axis occupation, the Dekemvriana and the Varkiza Agreement (in which ELAS, the main Partisan Army in Greece, agreed to a disarmament), the persecution of left wing citizens, communists and officials of EAM, started. There were 166 different anti-communist groups, such as those of Sourlas and Kalabalikis in Thessaly, and Papadopoulos in Macedonia. Archives of D.S. National Solidarity indicate that by 31 March 1946, nationwide, 1,289 suspected communists had been killed, 6,671 had been wounded, 84,931 had been arrested, 165 been raped, and the property of 18,767 was looted.  Imprisoned suspected communists numbered in excess of 30,000. Those responsible for the murders, according to the DSE, were collaborationist groups, national guards, rural police, and members of the British armed forces.

After the second party congress of KKE in February 1946, approximately 250 leftist self-defence militias, known as Groups of Democratic Armed Persecuted Fighters (ODEKA), were formed across Greece, totaling some 3,000 men. Most of the militiamen were former ELAS fighters. By April, ODEKA membership had grown to 4,400 fighters, reaching 5,400 fighters by August. Between April and June 1946, ODEKA fighters took part in 72 clashes, mainly targeting the Greek Gendarmerie and right wing paramilitary squads. The first coordinated attack by ODEKA took place on the night of 30/31 March 1946 when a band of 33 guerillas struck the Gendarmerie station at Litochoro, killing 13 gendarmes. The Battle of Litochoro marked the beginning of the third phase of the Greek Civil War.

The Communist Party of Greece led the armed struggle, through the General Partisan Command, which was created on 28 October 1946, and headed by Markos Vafiadis.  Order number 19 of the General Command, issued on 27 December 1946, renamed the guerilla groups to the Democratic Army of Greece (DSE). The relevant order included the following comment regarding the DSE: "It is the national people’s revolutionary army of the new Democratic Greece and fights with gun in hand for our National independence and for People's Democracy."

In 1947, KKE and the Democratic Army formed the "Provisional Democratic Government" ("Mountain Government") under the premiership of Markos Vafiadis. After this, KKE turned illegal.

As well as issues regarding the war effort, the Provisional Government had to deal with issues regarding the "People's Law" in the territories controlled by the DSE. These had to do with the judicial, financial, and political systems. As the Provisional Government was based on political forces which aimed to establish a socialist state, its decisions were driven by this political agenda. The self-determination of national minorities living in Greece was one priority. The Provisional Government and the KKE intended to establish a People's Republic of Greece in which all nationalities would work together in a Socialist state. An article written by Nikos Zachariadis expressed the KKE's strategy after the envisioned victory of the Democratic Army of Greece regarding what was then known as the "Macedonian Issue": "The Macedonian people will acquire an independent, united state with a coequal position within the family of free peoples' republics within the Balkans, within the family of Peoples' Republics to which the Greek people will belong. The Macedonian people are today fighting for this independent united state with a coequal position and is helping the DSE with all its soul...." The policy of self-determination for Macedonia within a People's Republic was reiterated during the 5th KKE Central Committee meeting held in January 1949, which declared that the "Macedonian people participating in the liberation struggle would find their full national re-establishment as they want giving their blood for this acquisition... Macedonian Communists should pay great attentions to foreign chauvinist and counteractive elements that want to break the unity between the Greek and Macedonian people. This will only serve the monarcho-fascists and British imperialism...."

The Provisional Government never achieved international recognition. During the first two years, from 1946 to the beginning of 1948, it managed to control large rural areas but no major town. At the same time, the Hellenic Army, advised by the British up to 1947 and afterwards by US military delegation led by General James Van Fleet, US Army, established the Greek government's position in the rest of the country as well as internationally.

After the fatal blow in early 1948, when DSE's III Brigade numbering 20,000 men and women was completely wiped out, DSE lost support in southern Greece as well as the political and economic control of a huge area. That was the beginning of the end of the Greek Civil War. At the same time, the efforts of the HQ of DSE to capture and hold a major town in the North such as Konitsa or Florina led to catastrophic defeat of the partisan army, which never recovered. On the other hand, the DSE did manage to achieve some military victories in 1948 and early 1949, in the battles of Karpenisi, Naousa, and Karditsa.  At the same time, DSE had a huge problem regarding reserves. Most of the men and women capable and willing to join its ranks were imprisoned or unable to reach areas controlled by DSE.

One of the biggest battles of the three-year Greek Civil War took place in the Grammos mountains in 1948. The operation took place after the Hellenic Army had secured the Peloponnese, where it managed to defeat the DSE's III Division, numbering 20,000 fighters. In the battle of Grammos, forces of the Hellenic Army, with the codename Operation Koronis, deployed 70,000 troops, while the DSE had 12,000 fighters. The battle lasted from 16 June until 21 August 1948. On that day, DSE forces, after hard fight, retreated into Albanian territory and reformed towards Vitsi. The maneuver from Grammos to Vitsi is considered one of the most important tactical actions of DSE during the war, from a military point of view.

Towards the end of August 1949, the Hellenic Army, under the leadership of Alexander Papagos, deployed 180,000 troops, and achieved the defeat of the DSE army of about 7,000 fighters on the Grammos-Vitsi front.  After this defeat, the DSE fighters crossed the border into Albania and scattered to camps all over the newly founded Socialist Republics, with the main body of the fighters camped in Taskent, the capital of Uzbekistan in the USSR.

The post-Civil War era left a country in ruins. Many of the nation's youth were either killed on the battlefield, imprisoned or became political refugees. The political situation was quite unstable for most of the next two decades – the decisive factor leading to the Greek military junta of 1967–1974. The ghost of the Civil War haunted Greece for many years after. In 1981, when the Panhellenic Socialist Movement (PASOK) party came to power in Greece following a long period of right-wing dominance, the political refugees of the DSE were finally given permission to return to their homeland (Slavic Macedonians excluded) by the new Interior Minister, George Gennimatas. Markos Vafiadis also returned to Greece and supported the PASOK government, and was elected a Member of Parliament for PASOK.

In 1989, the Greek Parliament voted unanimously a law that declared the three-year war of 1946–1949 as formally having been the "Greek Civil War" and accepted the former "Communist Bandits" as "Fighters of DSE", giving some of them privileges of pension.

Awards and decorations
On 4 April 1948, the Provisional Democratic Government's Law Number 13 established awards and decorations in order to mark extraordinary bravery and courage, as well as distinguished service during times of war by individual DSE soldiers and well as units. The aforementioned law established the following awards and decorations:
Medal of Military Valor Grade A and B
Electra Medal
Sniper Distinguished Service Medal
Saboteur Distinguished Service Medal
Distinguished Service in an Occupied City Medal
Artillery Distinguished Service Medal
Navy Distinguished Service Medal
Distinguished Service in the Monarchist-Fascist Army Medal
Aircraft Destruction Medal
Tank Destruction Medal
Distinguished Scouting Service Medal
Wound Badge
Distinction for Past Service in ELAS
Seniority Distinction

Α Provisional Democratic Government decree dating to 24 March 1949, awarded 33 participants of the Battle of Litochoro with the Medal of Military Valor which bore the inscription "LITOCHORO". A total of 970 DSE members received medals during the course of the civil war, including 557 men and 413 women.

The Oath of the DSE fighter
The following text was the oath that DSE members must swear and abide by.  During enrollment, the member would swear:

“I, a child of the Greek people and a DSE fighter, swear to battle with gun in hand, to shed my blood, and give even my life to banish from the soil of my motherland every last foreign occupier.  To banish every trace of fascism.  To secure and defend the national independence and territorial integrity of my motherland.  To secure and defend democracy, honor, work, fortune, and progress of my people.

I swear to be a good, brave and disciplined soldier, to carry out all the orders of my superiors, to observe all regulations, and not betray any secrets of the DSE.

I swear to be a good example to the people, to encourage popular unity and reconciliation, and to avoid any action that reduces and dishonors me, as a person and as a fighter.

My ideal is a free and strong democratic Greece and the progress and prosperity of the people.  And in the service of my ideal I offer my gun and my life.

If I ever prove to be a liar, and with bad intent violate my oath, let the vengeful hand of the nation, and the hate and scorn of the people, fall upon me implacably.”

References

Notes

Sources
 
 

 
Greek Civil War
Paramilitary organizations based in Greece
Military wings of socialist parties
Communist Party of Greece